Wilhelm Julius Heinrich Kahts (born 20 February 1947 in Pretoria, South Africa) is a former South African rugby union player.

Playing career
Kahts made his test debut for the Springboks on 31 May 1980 at Newlands in Cape Town against the touring British and Irish Lions team, captained by Bill Beaumont. He scored his first and only test try during his sixth test match and first at his home ground, Loftus Versveld, on 8 November 1980 against the touring French team.

His last test match, was the losing test against the South American Jaguars of Hugo Porta in Bloemfontein on 3 April 1982.

Test history

See also
List of South Africa national rugby union players – Springbok no. 509

References

1947 births
Living people
South African rugby union players
South Africa international rugby union players
Rugby union hookers
Blue Bulls players
Rugby union players from Pretoria